Berveni  is a commune of 3,331 inhabitants situated in Satu Mare County, Romania. It is composed of two villages, Berveni and Lucăceni (Újkálmánd).

Demographics
Ethnic groups (2002 census):
Hungarians (62.5%)
Romanians (31%)
Roma people (6.1%)

Natives
Sándor Demján, businessman

References

Communes in Satu Mare County